Marjaana Heikkinen (née Huovinen; born 19 April 1967) is a Finnish Paralympic athlete competing in F34 classification throwing events. Heikkinen represented Finland at the 2012 Summer Paralympic Games in London, entering the javelin throw and the shot put. She finished fourth in the shot and in the javelin, which stretched over four classifications, she threw a distance of 19.47 metres to win the bronze medal. As well as Paralympic success, Heikkinen has won medals at both World and  European Championships, including a javelin gold at the 2016 IPC Athletics European Championships in Grosseto.

References 

Paralympic silver medalists for Finland
Paralympic athletes of Finland
Athletes (track and field) at the 2012 Summer Paralympics
Finnish female javelin throwers
Finnish female shot putters
1967 births
Living people
Medalists at the 2012 Summer Paralympics
People from Kuopio
Paralympic medalists in athletics (track and field)
Medalists at the World Para Athletics European Championships
Athletes (track and field) at the 2020 Summer Paralympics
Sportspeople from North Savo